Jeevan Nedunchezhiyan and Franko Škugor were the defending champions but chose not to defend their title.

Attila Balázs and Gonçalo Oliveira won the title after defeating Lukáš Rosol and Sergiy Stakhovsky 6–0, 7–5 in the final.

Seeds

Draw

References
 Main Draw

Prosperita Open - Doubles
2018 Doubles